János Karlovits (25 November 1899 – 23 December 1986) was a Hungarian athlete. He competed in the men's pole vault at the 1928 Summer Olympics.

References

1899 births
1986 deaths
Athletes (track and field) at the 1928 Summer Olympics
Hungarian male pole vaulters
Olympic athletes of Hungary
Place of birth missing
20th-century Hungarian people